Aglaocetus is a genus of extinct baleen whales known from the Miocene of Patagonia, the US Eastern Seaboard, Japan and the Low Countries. It was once considered a member of Cetotheriidae along with many other putative cetotheres, but was recently recognized as representing a distinct family from true Cetotheriidae.

Species 
 
There are three currently recognized valid species: Aglaocetus moreni, A. latifrons, and A. rotundus.

The type species, Aglaocetus moreni, was originally described as a species of Cetotherium, but later recognized as generically distinct from the latter. "Aglaocetus" patulus, described from the Calvert Formation by Remington Kellogg in 1968, was recovered by Bisconti et al. (2013) in a different phylogenetic position than the Aglaocetus type species. In 2020, A. patulus was renamed Atlanticetus.

Distribution 
Fossils of Aglaocetus have been found in:

Miocene
 Gaimán Formation (Colhuehuapian-Santacrucian), Argentina
 Diest and Berchem Formations, Belgium
 Eibergen Member, Netherlands

References 

Prehistoric cetacean genera
Miocene cetaceans
Miocene mammals of Asia
Fossils of Japan
Miocene mammals of Europe
Fossils of the Netherlands
Fossils of Belgium
Miocene mammals of North America
Neogene United States
Miocene mammals of South America
Santacrucian
Colhuehuapian
Neogene Argentina
Fossils of Argentina
Gaiman Formation
Fossil taxa described in 1934
Taxa named by Remington Kellogg